Toy Story is the soundtrack album for the 1995 Disney/Pixar animated film Toy Story, with music composed, conducted, and performed by Randy Newman. The soundtrack includes the film score, as well as three original songs written and performed by Newman. It was released by Walt Disney Records on November 22, 1995, the week of the film's release, and the first soundtrack album from a Pixar film. 

The soundtrack for Toy Story received praise for its "sprightly, stirring score". It received Academy Award nominations for Best Original Score and Best Original Song ("You've Got a Friend in Me"). Despite the album's critical success, the soundtrack only peaked at number 94 on the Billboard 200 album chart. A cassette and CD single release of "You've Got a Friend in Me" was released on April 12, 1996, to promote the soundtrack's release. 

After it went out of print, the album was made available for purchase digitally in retailers such as iTunes. The soundtrack, along with Newman's complete unreleased score for the film was remastered and reissued on July 17, 2015 as the tenth entry of The Legacy Collection series.

Track listing

Walt Disney Records the Legacy Collection

Personnel

Musicians 

 Randy Newman – composer, lead vocals (1, 2, 3, 16), piano (1, 2, 16), orchestral arrangements (1–3), brass arrangements (1–3)
 Randy Kerber – keyboards (1, 2)
 Kevin Savigar – Hammond B-3 (16)
 John Goux, Dean Parks – guitars (1)
 Dennis Budimir – guitar (2, 3)
 Mark Goldenberg – guitar (16)
 Jimmy Johnson – bass (1)
 Larry Klein – bass (2)
 James Hutchinson – bass (16)
 Jim Keltner – drums (1, 2, 16)
 Yvonne Williams, Bobbi Page, Luana Jackman – background vocals (1, 2)
 Lyle Lovett – co-lead vocals (16)
 Gabe Witcher – violin (16)

Production 

 Randy Newman – producer
 Ted Kryczko, Joey Miskulin and Gary Powell – producer (1)
 Don Davis, Frank Wolf, Jim Flamberg, Chris Montan – producer (2–15)
 Don Was – producer (16)
 Brian Rajaratnam, John Costello, Michael Fahey, Monique Evelyn, Sean Badum – studio personnel, assistant recording engineer (1)
 Andrew Page – music producer (1)
 Jeff De Morris – assistant engineer (16)
 Rik Pekkonen – recording and mixing engineer (16)

Charts

References

1995 soundtrack albums
Pixar soundtracks
Randy Newman soundtracks
Walt Disney Records soundtracks
1990s film soundtrack albums
Soundtrack